Gibberula jeanae is a species of very small sea snail, a marine gastropod mollusk or micromollusk in the family Cystiscidae.

Description
Gibberula jeanae was introduced by Lussi and Smith in 1998 as one of eight new species and three new genera in the family Cystiscidae.

Distribution
Gibberula jeanae is found in South Africa.

References

Cystiscidae
Gastropods described in 1998
Marine fauna of Africa